SANAP may refer to:
South African National Antarctic Programme
Sabah Chinese Association, known in the early 1960s as the Sabah National Party